Godard is a surname. Notable people with the name include:

 Abel Godard (1835–1891), New York politician
 Agnès Godard, French cinematographer
 André Godard (1881–1965), French Iranologist
 Anne Godard (born 1971), French writer
 Benjamin Godard (1849–1895), French composer best known for his opera Jocelyn and salon music
 Christian Godard (born 1932), French comic artist
 Emile St. Godard (1905–1948), Canadian dog sled racer
 Eric Godard (born 1980), Canadian NHL player currently with the Dallas Stars
George S. Godard (1865–1936), American librarian
 Jean-Luc Godard (1930–2022), French-Swiss filmmaker
 Joel Godard (born 1938), announcer for Late Night with Conan O'Brien
 Ronald D. Godard (born 1942), American ambassador
 Vic Godard, British musician
 Yves Godard (1911–1975), French soldier

See also
Saint Godard (disambiguation)
Godart, surname
Goddard (surname)